Baker's Chocolate is a brand name for the line of baking chocolates owned by Kraft Heinz. Products include a variety of bulk chocolates, including white and unsweetened, and sweetened coconut flakes. It is one of the largest national brands of chocolate in the United States. The company was originally named Walter Baker & Company.

History
In 1764, John Hannon (or alternatively spelled "Hannan" in some sources) and the American physician Dr. James Baker started importing beans and producing chocolate in the Lower Mills section of Dorchester, Massachusetts.

After Hannon never returned from a 1779 sailing trip to the West Indies to purchase cocoa beans, his wife sold the company to Baker in 1780, and the company was renamed to the Baker Chocolate Company.  His first product was a cake of chocolate for making a sweetened chocolate drink. Distribution was mainly in the Northeastern United States until 1804, when James Baker's son, Edmund Baker, inherited the family business and increased production with a state-of-the-art mill.

The original brand name was "Hannon’s Best Chocolate", which was "manufactured for almost fifteen years" and was sold with a money-back guarantee if the consumer was unsatisfied with the product. The name was changed in 1780 after Hannon's wife, Elizabeth Gore Hannon, sold the company to Baker in 1780, after Hannon never returned from a 1779 sailing trip to the West Indies to purchase cocoa beans. At the time, it was rumored that Hannon intended to leave his wife, and thus deserted her.  Original versions of the brand were not prepared for baking, and before 1865, the company purveyed three grades of drinking chocolate, which were "Best Chocolate", "Common Chocolate" and "Inferior Chocolate". The inferior grade was mostly sold to West Indian and American slaves.

By 1849, under Walter Baker, the Baker's Chocolate brand had spread to California, during the Gold Rush era. Production was limited to one kind of chocolate until 1852, when employee Samuel German created "German's Sweet Chocolate" that had a higher sugar content than previous baking chocolates.  In 1957 a Dallas, Texas newspaper printed a cake recipe for "German's Chocolate Cake" based on this chocolate, which was reprinted by the company's owner General Foods under the "German chocolate cake", becoming the accepted name.

Production steadily increased through the century. The trademark logo of La Belle Chocolatière was adopted in 1883 by the fourth-generation familial owner, Henry L. Pierce, step-nephew of Walter Baker. Pierce began advertising Baker's Chocolate heavily in newspapers to increase sales. In 1896, Baker's Chocolate was advertising in around 8,000 newspapers in the United States. The company also advertised using signage and cards in grocery stores, in novels, in street cars and using billboards. Promotional offers of tableware and logo pins helped attract customers. Around the late 1800s, the company began promoting the notion of using chocolate as an ingredient in desserts and for baking.

Following Pierce's death in 1896, the Forbes Syndicate bought the company, which they sold  In 1927 to the Postum Cereal Company, later known as General Foods.  In 1966 production moved from Dorchester, Massachusetts to Dover, Delaware.  The company was passed onto Kraft Foods in 1989 when they acquired General Foods. Baker's is now owned by Kraft Heinz, a company formed by the merger between Kraft Foods and Heinz.

Products
Baker's continues to expand its line of products, focusing on conveniences for the home baker. Some products, such as vanilla extract and cocoa powder, have been discontinued with company turnovers. Other products are available to food service professionals in bulk, considerably different kinds of coconut, cocoa drinks, and bulk chocolate.

Baker's most common products:

German's Sweet Chocolate 'Bar' (48% cacao)
Semi-sweet chocolate (56% cacao)
Bittersweet chocolate (66% cacao)
Unsweetened chocolate (100% cacao)
Premium white chocolate (0% cacao)
Dipping chocolate (milk or dark)
Sweetened Angel Flake coconut

References

Further reading
   Includes historic photos of Baker Chocolate facilities.
 Boston Globe
 "Walter Baker Chocolate Company"  - Dorchester Atheneum
 Cf. also: "Walter Baker & Co. General History"  - Dorchester Atheneum
 Committee of the Dorchester Antiquarian and Historical Society, "History of the Town of Dorchester, Massachusetts", Boston : E. Clapp, Jr., 1859. Cf. p. 627.
 Stevens, Peter F., "It Happened in Dorchester: Dr. Baker and the Chocolate Factory", Dorchester Reporter, History of Dorchester.
 The Bostonian Society, "Sweet History: Dorchester and the Chocolate Factory", in conjunction with Kraft Foods, the Dorchester Historical Society, and the Milton Historical Society.

External links
 

Brand name chocolate